Raúl Uche Rubio (born 8 October 1997) is a Spanish professional footballer who plays as a forward for Waterford in the League of Ireland First Division.

Early life
Uche was born in Madrid and developed in the youth system of Rayo Vallecano. In 2015, he joined the club's reserve side in the Tercera División, making five appearances that season.

Club career

Leicester City
In 2016, Uche signed a four-year contract with Premier League champions Leicester City. In 2018, he went on loan with Betis Deportivo in Segunda División B, scoring four goals in fifteen league appearances, and making another two appearances in the promotion play-offs.

Valladolid Promesas
On 13 January 2020, after playing very little with Leicester's U-23 squad over his time at the club, Uche returned to Spain and signed with Segunda División B side Valladolid Promesas. That season, he made six league appearances, scoring one goal, and made one appearance in the promotion play-offs. The following year, he scored six goals in sixteen appearances.

Atlético Ottawa
On 28 July 2021, Uche signed with Canadian Premier League side Atlético Ottawa. He made his debut for the club on 2 August 2021 in a 2–1 loss to HFX Wanderers. Ottawa announced in January 2022 that they would not be exercising Uche's contract option, ending his time at the club after one season.

Salamanca
On 28 January 2022, Uche returned to Spain, signing with Segunda División RFEF side Salamanca UDS.

Waterford
On 1 September 2022, it was announced that Uche had signed for League of Ireland First Division club Waterford until the end of their season in November.

Career statistics

References

External links

1997 births
Living people
Association football forwards
Spanish footballers
Footballers from Madrid
Spanish expatriate footballers
Expatriate footballers in England
Spanish expatriate sportspeople in England
Expatriate soccer players in Canada
Spanish expatriate sportspeople in Canada
Rayo Vallecano players
Rayo Vallecano B players
Leicester City F.C. players
Betis Deportivo Balompié footballers
Real Valladolid Promesas players
Atlético Ottawa players
Salamanca CF UDS players
Waterford F.C. players
Tercera División players
Segunda División B players
Canadian Premier League players
Segunda Federación players
League of Ireland players
Expatriate association footballers in the Republic of Ireland